Paul Raymond Fry (born July 26, 1992) is an American professional baseball pitcher for the Toronto Blue Jays organization. He made his Major League Baseball (MLB) debut with the Baltimore Orioles in 2018 and has also played for the Arizona Diamondbacks.

Amateur career
After graduating from Waterford Kettering High School in Waterford, Michigan, Fry enrolled at St. Clair County Community College. In 2013, his sophomore year, he went 6-1 with a 1.80 ERA with 97 strikeouts in 55 innings.

Professional career

Seattle Mariners
After the season, Fry was drafted by the Seattle Mariners in the 17th round of the 2013 Major League Baseball draft. He signed and spent 2013 with the Arizona League Mariners where he was 2-3 with a 4.50 ERA in 34 innings pitched. He pitched for the Single-A Clinton LumberKings in 2014, posting a 4-4 record and 2.71 ERA in 28 relief appearances. Fry split the 2015 season between the High-A Bakersfield Blaze and Double-A Jackson Generals, going 4-5 with a 2.03 ERA and 1.15 WHIP in 80 innings pitched. After the 2015 season he played in the Arizona Fall League.

Fry was invited to Spring Training by the Mariners in 2016. He spent the year with the Triple-A Tacoma Rainers where he compiled a 3-1 record and 2.78 ERA in 48 games (47 relief appearances). The Mariners added Fry to their 40-man roster after the season.  Fry was assigned to Tacoma to begin the 2017 season and allowed 4 runs in 2 innings of work in his only appearance.

On April 11, 2017, Fry was designated for assignment by Seattle following the promotion of Mike Freeman.

Baltimore Orioles
On April 14, 2017, Fry was traded to the Baltimore Orioles in exchange for international signing bonus allocations. He was assigned to the Triple-A Norfolk Tides upon his acquisition. On June 4, Fry was outrighted off of the 40-man roster. He split time between the Double-A Bowie Baysox and Norfolk in 2017, and in 60.1 total innings pitched between Tacoma, Norfolk, and Bowie, Fry was 3-3 with a 4.33 ERA and 72 strikeouts. Fry was assigned to Norfolk to begin the 2018 season.

On June 29, 2018, Fry was selected to the 40-man roster and promoted to the major leagues for the first time. Fry made his MLB debut the same day, pitching  scoreless innings against the Los Angeles Angels. He finished the season 1-2 with a 3.35 ERA and 2 saves in 35 games. Fry pitched in 66 games for Baltimore in 2019, logging a 5.34 ERA with 55 strikeouts.

In 2020 for the Orioles, Fry pitched to a 2.45 ERA with 29 strikeouts over 22 innings pitched in 22 games. He was designated for assignment on May 14, 2022.

Arizona Diamondbacks
On May 18, 2022, Fry was traded to the Arizona Diamondbacks in exchange for minor leaguer Luis Osorio. He made only 1 appearance for the big league club, ceding a run in an inning of work. On August 17, Fry was designated for assignment. He spent the majority of the year with the Triple-A Reno Aces, recording a 4.40 ERA with 28 strikeouts in 28.2 innings pitched across 29 games. He elected free agency on October 6, 2022.

Toronto Blue Jays
On January 6, 2023, Fry signed a minor league contract with the Toronto Blue Jays organization.

Personal life
Fry and his wife, Paige, have one son together.

References

External links

1992 births
Living people
Sportspeople from Pontiac, Michigan
Baseball players from Michigan
Major League Baseball pitchers
Baltimore Orioles players
Arizona Diamondbacks players
Arizona League Mariners players
Clinton LumberKings players
Bakersfield Blaze players
Jackson Generals (Southern League) players
Peoria Javelinas players
Tacoma Rainiers players
Indios de Mayagüez players
Bowie Baysox players
Norfolk Tides players